Love Hotline is a Philippine television tabloid talk show broadcast by GMA News TV and GMA Network. Hosted by Jean Garcia, it premiered on GMA News TV from September 23, 2013 and ended on February 14, 2014. It was moved to GMA Network in May 2014. The show concluded on April 29, 2016 with a total of 206 episodes.

Ratings
According to AGB Nielsen Philippines' Mega Manila household television ratings, the final episode of Love Hotline scored an 8.6% rating.

References

External links
 

2013 Philippine television series debuts
2016 Philippine television series endings
Filipino-language television shows
GMA Network original programming
GMA News TV original programming
Philippine television talk shows